Jan Schnider (born January 7, 1983 in Oensingen) is a beach volleyball player from Switzerland, who with his team mate Martin Laciga is representing his native country at the 2008 Summer Olympics, in Beijing, China.

Playing partners
 Marcel Gscheidle
 Martin Laciga
 Tino Schutz
 Michel Kertai
 Philip Gabathuler
 Sebastian Beck
 Bernhard Vesti

Sponsors
Swatch

References

 

1983 births
Living people
Beach volleyball players at the 2008 Summer Olympics
Swiss beach volleyball players
Olympic beach volleyball players of Switzerland
Sportspeople from the canton of Solothurn